Escrow.com is a privately held internet escrow company. Based in San Francisco, CA, Escrow.com was founded in 1999 by Fidelity National Financial. It was acquired in 2015 by Freelancer.com.

History
Escrow.com was founded in 1999 by Fidelity National Financial in response to Bank of America's four million dollar purchase a few years earlier of Loans.com. Fidelity decided to liquidate Escrow.com and did so in 2002 in a trade with iLumin for a software license. In 2004, Escrow.com was purchased by a private investor. Currently, the company is owned by Freelancer Technology Pty Limited.

Overview
Escrow.com provides internet escrow services for many companies in e-commerce, international trade, online auctions, and online shopping, such as eBay, GoDaddy and AutoTrader. The items that are handled range from domain name sales to high monetary value items such as motor vehicles and heavy equipment/machinery. Escrow.com is a strategic partner with the United States Department of Commerce in support of President Obama’s National Export Initiative.

The company has been a guest blogger on ‘Tradeology’ – the official blog of the International Trade Administration as well as a featured writer in various magazines, including the Specialty Equipment Marketing Association (SEMA) News, EXPORT Magazine, and contributed towards having the term ‘Escrow Service' added to the third edition of the Trade Finance Guide, published by The International Trade Administration (ITA). 

In 2013 Escrow.com reached an accrued value of over two billion dollars in transaction volume.
The company works extensively in an effort to prevent online fraud and is a resource for the Internet Crime Complaint Center, a multi-agency task force made up by the Federal Bureau of Investigation (FBI), the National White Collar Crime Center (NW3C), and the Bureau of Justice Assistance (BJA)

Services
The escrow company takes the buyer's funds, verifies the deposit to the seller, and transfers the funds to the seller after the buyer receives the merchandise, thus protecting the interests of both the buyer and seller.

 Vehicle Escrow: An escrow process that protects both buyers and sellers.  It ensures the money is transferred and the vehicle is delivered with every sale.
 Domain and Website Escrow: An escrow process that ensures buyers get the domain or website and sellers get paid. 
 Domain Name Holding Escrow: A service designed for domain name buyers and sellers who agree to hold the domain(s) in escrow while the buyer makes scheduled payments.
 General Merchandise Escrow: An escrow process used for almost any product that protects both buyers and sellers from fraud.
 Milestone Escrow: An escrow process where Escrow.com does not release payments to the seller until each phase/milestone has been completed and approved by the buyer.
 Broker Escrow: A three-party escrow transaction that offers brokers the ability to begin, manage and close transactions privately and in a secure manner.
 Trade Transaction Protection: An escrow process used for international trade that protects both exporters and importers from fraud.

Licenses & Partnerships

Licenses

 Escrow.com has 42 financial services licenses granted or in-application

Partnerships

 National Independent Automobile Dealers Association
 Specialty Equipment Marketing Association (SEMA)   
 eBay
 Go Daddy
 DomainNameSales.com
 United States Department of Commerce
 International Trade Administration 
 United States Commercial Service
 BizBroker24.com

References

External links
Escrow.com Website

Financial services companies of the United States
American companies established in 1999
Financial services companies established in 1999
Companies based in San Francisco
1999 establishments in California